Ennio Antonelli (born 18 November 1936) is an Italian cardinal of the Catholic Church and retired President of the Pontifical Council for the Family.

Early life and ordination

Born in Todi, he first attended seminary there, and then in Assisi and the Pontifical Lateran University, Rome, where he was awarded a licentiate in sacred theology. He later earned a doctorate in classics at the University of Perugia. He was ordained a priest for the diocese of Todi in 1960.

Bishop
He eventually became rector of the Seminary of Perugia and a professor of classics in Assisi before being consecrated a bishop in 1982, when Pope John Paul II named him to head the diocese of Gubbio. In 1988 he was advanced to Archbishop of Perugia-Città del Pieve, from which see he stepped down in 1995 to become Secretary-General of the Italian Episcopal Conference.

Cardinal
He served in this position until March 2001, when he was named to the see of Florence, whose archbishop is traditionally named a cardinal, and he was duly elevated in the consistory of 2003, becoming Cardinal-Priest of Sant'Andrea delle Fratte.

He resigned as Archbishop of Florence on 7 June 2008, on becoming President of the Pontifical Council for the Family.

On 29 January 2011 Cardinal Antonelli was appointed a member of the Pontifical Council for the Pastoral Care of Migrants and Itinerants.

Cardinal Antonelli was considered an Italian papabile heading into the 2005 papal conclave in which Pope Benedict XVI was elected and at which Antonelli was a cardinal elector. Cardinal Antonelli is no longer eligible to vote in any future papal conclaves as he turned 80 on 18 November 2016. He retired as president of the Pontifical Council for the Family on 26 June 2012.

On 15 September 2012 he was appointed a member of the Congregation for the Causes of Saints for a five-year term.

He was one of the cardinal electors who participated in the 2013 papal conclave that selected Pope Francis.

On Saturday, 19 July 2014, according to the Vatican web site's daily Bulletin of the Holy See Press Office, where papal appointments are listed, Cardinal Antonelli was appointed by Pope Francis to serve as his Special Envoy to the consecration of the new Shrine of St. Gabriel in Teramo.

Views

Cardinal Antonelli is generally seen as a moderate, with a strong interest in social justice and peace issues. In response to demands that the Church denounce divorcees who were candidates for political office in the 1990s, he said the Church should be more concerned with their voting record. When in 2009 the Italian Court of Cassation declared there was no substantial difference in law between a family based on marriage and one resulting from cohabitation, he reacted by saying that, in the light of recent sociological studies that reveal the benefits to society of what is called the traditional family and the disadvantages for society of single-parent families and those of cohabiting couples, the traditional family is needed more than ever today both for family members and for society as a whole.

References

External links 
 
 Papabili list for 2009 at "Popes-and-Papacy"
Profile on Catholic Hierarchy 

1936 births
Living people
People from Todi
21st-century Italian cardinals
Roman Catholic archbishops of Florence
Pontifical Council for the Family
Cardinals created by Pope John Paul II
Members of the Pontifical Council for Social Communications
Members of the Congregation for the Causes of Saints
20th-century Italian Roman Catholic archbishops
Pontifical Roman Seminary alumni
University of Perugia alumni
Pontifical Lateran University alumni